= Nagbavji =

- village
- Country: India
- State: Rajasthan

Government
  - Body: Gram panchayat

Languages
  - Official: Hindi
- Time zone: UTC+5:30 (IST)

Nagbavji is an Indian village. It lies about 550 km (340 mi) south-west of India's capital, Delhi. It was the location of a truck accident where 85 Hindu pilgrims were killed after a truck went down a gorge.
